"The One with Ross and Monica's Cousin" is the nineteenth episode of Friends seventh season. It first aired on the NBC network in the United States on April 19, 2001.

The Daily Beast included the episode in their list of 15 Times 'Friends' Was Really, Really Weird, due to Ross' crush on his cousin.

Plot
Joey auditions for a big movie role which requires him to appear naked. A problem arrives, however, when the part calls for an uncircumcised man. Monica helps Joey try to get the part by making replicas of things on the outside of the body using various meats and silly putty. Joey goes to his audition, which goes well until a part of the replica falls off, horrifying the director and casting director.
 
Rachel and Phoebe plan Monica's bridal shower at the last minute. The two had completely forgotten until Monica reminds them, so are left to make quick decisions for a party within two days. Arbitrarily calling people from Monica's address book Phoebe takes from her purse results in a weird crowd neither of them knows and they both forget to invite the bride. When Monica arrives, she accidentally bad mouths the guests under the belief that they left before she arrived.
 
Ross and Monica's cousin, Cassie, visits, and Chandler becomes attracted to her. As a result, she moves from Monica's to Ross' apartment. Unfortunately, Ross gets smitten by her looks as well. When he and Cassie are watching a movie together, Ross gets the impression that Cassie wants to have sex with him, so he reaches out to kiss her. Horrified, she storms out of the apartment. Cassie finally stays at Phoebe's, but she is smitten by her looks as well.

Reception
Sam Ashurst from Digital Spy ranked the episode #148 on their ranking of the 236 Friends episodes, writing that it had an "amusing twist ending".

The Independent writer Clémence Michallon ranked the episode #206 on their ranking of the 236 Friends episodes.

CollegeHumor writer Willie Muse had a negative opinion on "The One with Ross and Monica's Cousin", due to him considering Ross' move on his cousin to be one of the worst things he ever did.

Grantland writer Sam Hockley-Smith thought that the show jumped the shark with this episode, as he considered Ross' crush on his cousin to be one of his most embarrassing moments.

References

Friends (season 7) episodes